Shernoff is a surname.

People with the surname
Andy Shernoff (born 1955), American musician.
Michael Shernoff (1951–2008), American psychologist.
William Shernoff (born c. 1949), American lawyer.